Juan Barnett (born February 21, 1970) is an American politician who has served in the Mississippi State Senate from the 34th district since 2016.

References

1970 births
Living people
Democratic Party Mississippi state senators
African-American state legislators in Mississippi
21st-century American politicians
21st-century African-American politicians
20th-century African-American people